Green Dot Public Schools (GDPS) is a non-profit educational organization charter school district headquartered in Downtown Los Angeles, California that operates 20 public schools in Greater Los Angeles, including nine charter high schools, five schools in Tennessee, and three in Washington.

The organization was founded by Steve Barr in 1999.  The schools that Green Dot operates in California are each named Ánimo, the Spanish word for rigor and strength. The graduation rates of schools operated by Green Dot are higher than those of the Los Angeles Unified School District; in the 2014–2015 school year, 80% of students graduated from Ánimo schools, compared to 72% that year for LAUSD (79.7% for Comprehensive High Schools.)

In 2006, Green Dot opened 5 charter schools within the attendance area of Los Angeles' troubled Locke High School. In 2008, a majority of permanent teachers at Locke High School voted to reconstitute the underperforming school as a Green Dot Charter School. In 2014, Green Dot served some public schools in Memphis, Tennessee, that were previously operated by Memphis City Schools.

California School results
Green Dot serves middle and high school students in and around Los Angeles, California. The five Green Dot schools that opened prior to 2006 are achieving high results on several key metrics compared to neighboring traditional public schools. Green Dot's first campus, Ánimo Leadership High School in Inglewood, has an API score of 806 compared to the 589 score of neighboring LAUSD Hillcrest High school.

In 2008, an OpEd by in the Los Angeles Times raised numerous concerns about plans for Green Dot to "operate Locke High School during the regular school year" and predicted failure. UCLA's National Center for Research on Evaluation, Standards, and Student Testing evaluated Green Dot's Locke Transformation Project, finding generally positive results. The CRESST Evaluation claims, "results from matched samples of students suggest that 9th graders who entered GDL generally performed better on a range of student outcome measures than they would have if they had attended a comparable LAUSD high school." Countering concerns that Green Dot would simply purge students who proved more challenging to educate, the CRESST Evaluation concludes, "GDL students were very similar to Locke’s demographic profile prior to the GDL transformation, as well as to comparison students from GDL feeder schools who attended three comparison high schools in the Los Angeles Unified School District (LAUSD)."

Schools
Green Dot Public Schools has 25 charter schools:

California
Ánimo City of Champions High School
Animo Compton Middle School/High School

Ánimo Ellen Ochoa Charter Middle 
School
Ánimo Florence Firestone Middle School
Animo Inglewood Charter High School
Ánimo Jackie Robinson Charter High School
Ánimo James B. Taylor Charter Middle School
Ánimo Jefferson Charter Middle School
Animo Leadership Charter High School
Ánimo Legacy Charter Middle School
Alain Leroy Locke College Preparatory Academy
Ánimo Mae Jemison Charter Middle School
Ánimo Pat Brown Charter High School
Ánimo Ralph Bunche Charter High School
Ánimo South Los Angeles Charter High School
Animo Venice Charter High School
Ánimo Watts College Preparatory Academy
Ánimo Westside Charter Middle School
Oscar De La Hoya Ánimo Charter High School

Tennessee
Bluff City High School
Fairley High School
Hillcrest High School (Memphis, Tennessee)
Kirby Middle School
Wooddale Middle School

Texas
MLK Middle School

External links

 Green Dot Public Schools website

References

 
Education in Los Angeles
Education in Los Angeles County, California
Charter school organizations based in California
Educational institutions established in 1999
1999 establishments in California